Boldklubben Frem (also known as Frem, BK Frem or BK Frem Copenhagen) is a Danish sports club based in the Valby-Sydhavnen area of Copenhagen. It is best known for its semi-professional football team. Since its foundation in 1886, Frem has won the Danish Championships six times and the Danish Cup twice. Until the disastrous bankruptcy in 1993, Frem had played in the top division all but six seasons. After the bankruptcy the club fought its way back to the top of Danish football, but in 2010 it went bankrupt again and was demoted to the Copenhagen Series—the fifth tier in the Danish league system. After two back to back promotions, the club now participates in the Danish 2nd Division, the third tier.

The club also has a youth and amateur football branch, as well as a cricket team. It is also involved in the running of the KIES sports boarding school.

History

Early years

BK Frem were founded as Fremskridtsklubbens Cricketklub on 17 July 1886 by a group of seditious young men from the then government hostile Venstre Reform Party, as a cloak for political activities. In 1887 football was introduced and the name was changed to Boldklubben Frem, stiftet af Fremskridtsklubben (lit. Danish: The Ball Club Forward, founded by the Progress Club).

In the first two years of the life of the club, only two sports matches were played, but when the Danish Football Association introduced a football tournament in 1889, the club was invited to participate, and in 1890 Frem became the first Danish club to beat KB in a football match. In 1902 Frem became unofficial Danish champions when they won the league played under the auspices of the Danish FA. This was the first ever senior title won by the club.

In 1905, the club moved to its own field at Enghavevej, Vesterbro, obtaining its distinct working class profile. To this day, both the Social Democrats and the Union of Metalworkers holds Frem sponsorships. In 1912, Frem joined the representative team Stævnet which arranged lucrative exhibition matches and played a decisive role in Danish football politics.

Palmy days
In the years 1923–1944, Frem won six Danish Championships.

Division Yo-Yoing
Since 1983 Frem had been battling economically, and in 1993 saw themselves demoted to the Danmarksserien following a bankruptcy, which was due to a debt of DKK 8,500,000 and allegations of fraud.

Following a short but expensive spell in the Superliga in 2003–2004, Frem were once again on the verge of bankruptcy with a debt of DKK 10,000,000.

In 2010, after years of uncertain economy, the club once again went bankrupt and was demoted to the Copenhagen Series.

Supporters
Frem's official supportergroup is called "BK Frem Support". It is Denmark's oldest supporters club, formed in 1986.
Frem fans are especially known for unconditional love and support. Even when demoted to the fifth tier, attendances almost didn't drop.

Home ground

Frem play their home matches at the modest and somewhat worn-down, municipality-owned Valby Idrætspark.

In the early years, Frem were located on Østerbro in Copenhagen, playing its matches at Blegdamsfælleden, alongside its main rivals in the early years; AB and KB. In 1905 Frem moved to its own field at Enghavevej, Vesterbro. Being a field-owning club gave Frem the advantage of entry fees. Its location however lead to some muttering from football fans who found it to be too far out of town.

In 1942, Frem moved to Valby Idrætspark, where the current main stand was erected in 1965. Throughout the years a lot of matches has been played at Idrætsparken. It is unclear when this tradition was discontinued.

During the 2000s, there where several plans for a new stadium, but they were never realized.

In 2006 the Copenhagen Municipality predicted that the main stand of the current Valby Idrætspark would last another 5–10 years. As of April 2007 major investments in the current stadium are put on hold as a decision on the construction of a new stadium is being awaited. A final decision is expected was April 2008.

Hans Hermansen, then managing director of BK Frem, has indicated that according to the plan, the construction of a new stadium should commence no later than 2010. However, the municipality estimated 2012. Frem suggested that it might be completed by 2016.

In January 2016 the municipality ordered a renovation of the existing stadium, worth 3 mio €, thus cancelling plans for a new stadium in the near future.  The renovation is due ultimo 2017.

Sponsorships
After the clubs bankruptcy in summer 2010, Frem got a helping hand from Danish brewery giant Carlsberg. Being from the same city they signed on as main sponsor, because they saw it as a chance to help the fellow Valby-based brand back on its feet. In July 2013 an extension for three years was announced. On 11 June 2016 it was prolonged for another three years.
In June 2015 Frem announced they would switch back from Diadora to their old shirt partner, Hummel, starting from the 2015/2016 season.

Kit manufacturers and shirt sponsors

Honours

Danish Champions
Winners (6): 1923, 1931, 1933, 1936, 1941, 1944
Runner-up (9): 1930, 1935, 1937, 1938, 1948, 1958, 1966, 1967, 1976
3rd placed (6): 1934, 1955, 1957, 1968, 1971, 1992
Danish Cup
Winners (2): 1956, 1978
Runner-up (3): 1969, 1971, 1981
Unofficial Danish Champions
Winners (1): 1902
Runner-up (3): 1899, 1901, 1903
Copenhagen Champions
Winners (3): 1904, 1923, 1933
Runner-up (8): 1906, 1908, 1910, 1911, 1918, 1922, 1929, 1937
KBUs Pokalturnering
Winners (6): 1925, 1927, 1938, 1940, 1943, 1946
Runner-up (9): 1913, 1918, 1919, 1922, 1924, 1930, 1934, 1939, 1944
Baneklubberne Cup
Winners (1): 1911
UEFA Intertoto Cup
Winners (2): 1969, 1977

Club officials

Chairman: Per Jakobsen
Head Coach: Lasse Holmgaard
Assistant Coach: Samir Karadza
Goalkeeping Coach: Morten Cramer
Fitness Coach: Martin Frandsen
Reserve Team Coach: Martin E. Jensen
U19 Team Coach: Kim Voss
U17 Team Coach: Christian Antonsen

Head Coach history

Season-by-season results

Recent years

League status

Post 1993 bankruptcy and demotion

Green denotes the highest level of football in Denmark; yellow the second-highest; red the third-highest; black the fourth-highest; grey the fifth-highest.

All time

Green denotes the highest level of football in Denmark; yellow the second-highest; red the third-highest; black the fourth-highest; grey the fifth-highest.

European competitions record

Cricket

Club
The Cricket branch is one of the oldest in Denmark. 
It is still active and at the moment have a team in the 2nd-best tier.

Officials
Chairman: Kingsley Peiris

Honors
Copenhagen Champions
 Winners (2): 1894, 1898

.

Footnotes and references

External links
 Official website
 Historical archive

 
Frem, Boldklubben
Frem, Boldklubben
Frem, Boldklubben
1886 establishments in Denmark
Football clubs in Copenhagen